Nichols High School is a historic high school located at Nichols in Tioga County, New York.  It is a Tudor Revival style, three-story, rectangular brick structure with limestone trim built in 1911–1912.  The hipped roof is topped with a belfry that retains the original school bell. The building was last used as a school in 1958.

The architects were T. I. Lacey & Son of Binghamton and the builder was Thomas Maney. It was listed on the National Register of Historic Places in 1996.

References

School buildings on the National Register of Historic Places in New York (state)
School buildings completed in 1912
Buildings and structures in Tioga County, New York
1912 establishments in New York (state)
National Register of Historic Places in Tioga County, New York